Inés Melchor (born August 30, 1986 in Acobambilla, Huancavelica) is a Peruvian long-distance runner. She competed in the marathon at the 2012 Summer Olympics, placing 25th with a time of 2:28:54. In September 2014 she placed 8th at the Berlin Marathon with a time of 2:26.48, new Peruvian national record and the South America area record.  Melchor also holds Peruvian records for the 5000 and 10,000 metres on the track.

She won numerous youth and junior medals at the continental level and competed at the 2003 World Championships in Athletics and the 2004 Summer Olympics while still a teenager. She won a gold medal double in the 5000 m and 10,000 m at the 2009 South American Championships in Athletics. She also won the bronze medal in the 5000 m at the 2011 Pan American Games. She is a three-time champion at the South American Cross Country Championships.

Biography

Early life
Inés Melchor, or her complete name is Santa Inés Melchor Huiza, was born in 1986 in Acobambilla District, Huancavelica Province, Perú.

She was only three months old, when her parents decided to move to Huancayo. There, Inés attended local school in Nuestra Señora del Cocharcas and eventually earned a bachelor of laws from Los Andes Peruvian University.

Youth and junior career
Melchor emerged as one of South America's most promising long-distance runners at an early age. She was the 3000 metres silver medallist at the 2000 South American Youth Championships in Athletics at the age of thirteen. The following year she won the 5000 metres title at the 2001 South American Junior Championships in Athletics (also taking 3000 m bronze), and then won the 3000 m title and 5000 m silver at the Pan American Juniors a week later.

As the youngest in the field at the 2002 South American Junior Championships, both Nadia Rodríguez and Silvia Paredes (two and three years older than Melchor) got the better of her and the Peruvian left with only a 3000 m bronze medal. In the younger age bracket she won the 3000 m at the South American Youth Championships and also managed a bronze in the 1500 metres.

Melchor was dominant regionally in 2003: aged sixteen, she won both the 3000 m and 5000 m titles at the South American Juniors and the Pan American Juniors. At the 2003 World Youth Championships in Athletics 3000 m race she was the best performer from the Americas, taking sixth overall. Such was her talent, she was one of a handful of Peruvian entrants for the 2003 World Championships in Athletics, where she ran in the 5000 metres.

In 2004, she won her first junior title at the South American Cross Country Championships. She was the only runner from the Americas in the 3000 m at the 2004 World Junior Championships in Athletics and placed eleventh. The seventeen-year-old made her Olympic debut for Peru at the 2004 Athens Olympics, competing in the first round of the 5000 m. She was the youngest of only twelve Peruvians present at the games. She also placed ninth in the 3000 m at the 2004 Ibero-American Championships in Athletics that year.

She was South America's best performer in the junior race at the 2005 IAAF World Cross Country Championships, coming 29th overall. In her last year of junior eligibility she won a 3000/5000 m double at the South American Juniors. She was the 5000 m champion at the Pan American Juniors but was beaten into second in the 3000 m by Canada's Alyson Kohlmeier.

Start of senior career
In her first year of senior competition, she competed sparingly, with her main appearance being 72nd in the long race at the 2006 IAAF World Cross Country Championships after a victory at the South American Cross Country . The following year saw her make a breakthrough as a senior runner. She was runner-up at the South American Cross Country behind Ednalva Laureano da Silva. At her first continental senior championships she was fifth in the 5000 m but took the 10,000 metres silver medal behind Lucélia Peres. At the Pan American Games she ran in the 10,000 m and broke Marilu Salazar's fourteen-year-old Peruvian record with a time of 33:36.17 minutes for fifth place.

In 2008, she won her second senior title at the South American Cross Country and did a 5000/10,000 m double at the national championships, breaking Faustina Huamani's 5000 m national record in the process with a time of 16:17.37 minutes. She went unchallenged in either event at the 2008 South American Under-23 Championships in Athletics, held in Lima and left with two gold medals.

South American titles

She reduced her national records further at the 2009 South American Championships in Athletics held on home turf in Lima. She established herself as the region's best distance runner as she won the 5000 m with a time of 16:00.41 minutes and the 10,000 m with a time of 33:11.79 minutes (also a championship record).

She ran in the 5000 m heats at the 2009 World Championships in Athletics later that year and tried out a new event at the 2009 IAAF World Half Marathon Championships, where she was 40th in a personal best of 74:33 minutes. She ended her year with a 10,000 m win at the Bolivarian Games.

In 2010, she won the South American cross country title for a third time, but did not compete for the rest of the year. She returned to action near the end of 2011 and claimed the 5000 m bronze medal at the 2011 Pan American Games.

Marathon running
Melchor moved up to the marathon distance in the 2012 season. Every year she runs about two or three marathons a year. Also she runs short races during the year. She made her debut at the Seoul International Marathon and her time of 2:30:04 hours for sixth was a Peruvian marathon record. This qualified her for the 2012 Summer Olympics in London. She improved her national record further at the competition, completing a run of 2:28:54 hours for 25th place. At the closing ceremony she was the flag bearer for Peru.

In 2013, she placed third at the Santiago Marathon, won the Ultimas Noticias 15K in Ecuador, and was runner-up at the Bogotá Half Marathon. On April 12, 2015, she won the Santiago Marathon which confirmed her qualification for the 2016 Summer Olympics in Rio de Janeiro.

Personal bests
1500 m: 4:30.78 – Alcalá de Henares, 4 July 2004
3000 m: 9:28.44 – Sherbrooke, 9 July 2003
5000 m: 15:30.63 NR – Trujillo, 28 November 2013
10,000 m: 33:07.75 – Lima, 6 October 2013 
Half marathon: 1:12:31 – Medellín, 8 September 2013 
Marathon: 2:26.48 NR - Berlin, 28 September 2014

Achievements

References

 
 London Summer 2012 site

Living people
1986 births
Peruvian female long-distance runners
Peruvian female marathon runners
Athletes (track and field) at the 2004 Summer Olympics
Athletes (track and field) at the 2012 Summer Olympics
Athletes (track and field) at the 2016 Summer Olympics
Olympic athletes of Peru
People from Huancavelica Region
World Athletics Championships athletes for Peru
Athletes (track and field) at the 2007 Pan American Games
Athletes (track and field) at the 2011 Pan American Games
Athletes (track and field) at the 2015 Pan American Games
Pan American Games bronze medalists for Peru
Pan American Games medalists in athletics (track and field)
Athletes (track and field) at the 2018 South American Games
South American Games gold medalists for Peru
South American Games bronze medalists for Peru
South American Games medalists in athletics
Medalists at the 2011 Pan American Games
South American Games gold medalists in athletics
20th-century Peruvian women
21st-century Peruvian women